Common names: pygmy rattlesnake, eastern pygmy rattlesnake, ground rattlesnake, leaf rattler, death rattler, more.
Sistrurus miliarius, commonly called the pygmy rattlesnake, is a species of venomous snake in the subfamily Crotalinae (pit vipers) of the family Viperidae. The species is endemic to the Southeastern United States. Three subspecies are currently recognized.

Description

Shine (1978) suggested that in some populations, males may be larger than females, but a later study by Bishop et al. (1996) did not find sexual dimorphism of any kind in a population in Volusia County, Florida.

At midbody, the rows of dorsal scales usually number 23. The dorsal pattern consists of a series of oval or subcircular spots with somewhat regular edges. The spots on the flanks are mostly round and not much higher than they are wide. Belly pigmentation towards the rear is more limited to indistinct blotches found on pairs of adjacent scales. Juveniles' color patterns are similar to the adults, although they may be paler or more vividly marked, and the tips of their tails are yellow.

Common names

Common names for S. miliarius include pygmy rattlesnake, ground rattlesnake, hog-nosed rattlesnake, little rattlesnake, miliar(y) rattlesnake, North American smaller rattlesnake, oak-leaf rattler, pygmy ground rattlesnake, small rattlesnake, southeastern ground rattlesnake, southern ground rattlesnake, southern pygmy rattlesnake, spotted rattler, spotted rattlesnake, southern rattlesnake.
Older common names might include bastard rattlesnake, nipple snake, Carolina ground rattlesnake, brick red rattlesnake, Carolina pygmy rattlesnake, Catesby's small snake, dwarf rattlesnake, eastern pygmy rattlesnake, grey rattlesnake, and ground rattler (Garman, 1887).

Geographic range 

S. miliarius is found in the Southeastern United States from southern and eastern North Carolina, south through peninsular Florida and west to East Texas and Oklahoma. The type locality given is "Carolina". Schmidt (1953) proposed that this be restricted to "Charleston, South Carolina".

Habitat
Sistrurus miliarius reportedly inhabits flatwoods, sandhills, mixed forests, and floodplains, and is also found near lakes and marshes.

Conservation status
This species is classified as least concern  on the IUCN Red List of Threatened Species (v3.1, 2001). Species are listed as such due to their wide distribution, presumed large population, or because the population is unlikely to be declining fast enough to qualify for listing in a more threatened category. The population trend is stable; it was assessed in 2007. This species is not protected by South Carolina or Georgia state law, but pygmy rattlesnakes are protected in North Carolina and Tennessee.

Behavior
S. miliarius is usually seen in the summer sunning itself or crossing the road late in the day. The tiny rattle makes a buzzing sound that can only be heard from a few feet away. Some individuals are very aggressive and strike furiously, while others seem lethargic and do not even attempt to rattle. It does not dig its own burrows, but rather uses those dug by small rodents or gopher tortoises (Gopherus polyphemus).

Feeding

The diet of S. miliarius includes small mammals and birds, lizards, insects, and frogs, as well as other snakes. Pygmy rattlesnakes also include giant desert centipedes in their diet, which they hunt by active pursuit, grabbing and flipping the centipedes around while simultaneously injecting venom to prevent injury by the victim. They also ambush lizards such as skinks by using their tails as lures, as is common in many other species of vipers. Caudal luring becomes less effective for adults, as the prey size and type changes. Their feeding strategy becomes sit-and-wait, with individuals remaining in a coiled position for days at a time.

Venom
Since S. miliarius is unable to produce much venom, it is unlikely to be able to deliver a fatal bite to a human adult.

This snake produces cytotoxic venom that is strongly hemorrhagic and tissue toxic, but devoid of any neurotoxins. The venom was the basis for the development of the drug eptifibatide, which is used to prevent clotting during a heart attack. The venom is somewhat different in that it contains substantial amounts of serotonin and related tryptamine compounds.

Subspecies

Gallery

References

External links

Sistrurus miliarius  at University of Texas - Herps of Texas . Accessed 30 November 2006.
The Pigmy Rattlesnake Homepage (Sistrurus miliarius) at Stetson University Biology Department. Accessed 30 November 2006.

Further reading
Boulenger GA (1896). Catalogue of the Snakes in the British Museum (Natural History). Volume III., Containing the ... Viperidæ. London: Trustees of the British Museum (Natural History). (Taylor and Francis, printers). xiv + 727 pp. + Plates I-XXV. (Sistrurus miliarius, pp. 569-570).
Conant R, Bridges W (1939). What Snake Is That? A Field Guide to the Snakes of the United States East of the Rocky Mountains. (With 108 drawings by Edmond Malnate). New York and London: D. Appleton-Century Company. Frontispeice map + viii + 163 pp. + Plates A-C, 1-32. (Sistrurus miliarius, pp. 143-145 + Plate 29, figures 84A, 84B; Plate 30, figure 85).
Hubbs, Brian; O'Connor, Brendan (2012). A Guide to the Rattlesnakes and other Venomous Serpents of the United States. Tempe, Arizona: Tricolor Books.129 pp. . (Sistrurus miliarius, pp. 78-85).
Linnaeus C (1766). Systema naturæ per regna tria naturæ, secundum classes, ordines, genera, species, cum characteribus, differentiis, synonymis, locis. Tomus I. Editio Duodecima, Reformata. Stockholm: L. Salvius. 532 pp. (Crotalus miliarius, new species, p. 372). (in Latin).
Powell R, Conant R, Collins JT (2016). Peterson Field Guide to Reptiles and Amphibians of Eastern and Central North America, Fourth Edition. Boston and New York: Houghton Mifflin Harcourt, xiv + 494 pp., 47 plates, 207 figures. . (Sistrurus miliarius, pp. 443-444 + Plate 46).
Schmidt KP, Davis DD (1941). Field Book of Snakes of the United States and Canada. New York: G.P. Putnam's Sons. 365 pp., 34 plates, 103 figures. (Sistrurus miliarius, pp. 289-290 + Plate 31).
Smith HM, Brodie ED Jr (1982). Reptiles of North America: A Guide to Field Identification. New York: Golden Press. 239 pp.  (paperback),  (hardcover). (Sistrurus miliarius, pp. 202-203).
Zim HS, Smith HM (1956). Reptiles and Amphibians: A Guide to Familiar American Species: A Golden Nature Guide. Revised Edition. New York: Simon and Schuster. 160 pp. (Sistrurus miliarius, pp. 110, 156).

miliarius
Reptiles of the United States
Fauna of the Southeastern United States
Taxa named by Carl Linnaeus
Reptiles described in 1766